Ali Beratlıgil (21 October  1931 − 1 February 2016) was a Turkish football defender who played for Turkey in the 1954 FIFA World Cup. He also played for Galatasaray S.K.

References

External links
 
 

1931 births
2016 deaths
Turkish footballers
Turkey international footballers
Association football defenders
Galatasaray S.K. footballers
1954 FIFA World Cup players
Sarıyer S.K. managers
Fatih Karagümrük S.K. managers
Turkish football managers
People from İzmit